Lolah Butte is a summit in Deschutes County, Oregon, in the United States.

Lolah is a name most likely derived from Chinook Jargon, meaning "round" or "complete".

References

Buttes of Oregon
Mountains of Deschutes County, Oregon
Mountains of Oregon